Crown attorneys or crown counsel (or, in Alberta and New Brunswick, crown prosecutors) are the prosecutors in the legal system of Canada.

Crown attorneys represent the Crown and act as prosecutor in proceedings under the Criminal Code and various other statutes. Criminal prosecutions pursuant to federal statutes other than the Criminal Code, such as the Controlled Drugs and Substances Act, the Income Tax Act, and others, are generally (but not exclusively) conducted by the Public Prosecution Service of Canada, which also handles most narcotic case outside of Quebec and New Brunswick. There are similarities between this role and the procurator fiscal in Scotland, crown prosecutor in England and Wales and United States Attorney or district attorney in the United States. Crown attorneys are not elected. They are civil servants and may be removed from their positions pursuant to their employment agreements.

Although the enactment of criminal law is under federal jurisdiction in Canada, the prosecution of most Criminal Code offences—outside of Yukon, the Northwest Territories, and Nunavut—is the responsibility of the provincial Attorneys General and their lawful deputies by virtue of the "interpretation" section of the Criminal Code. As a result, the vast majority of crown attorneys are employed by Canada's ten provinces.

Lawyers who act on civil or administrative matters for the provincial Crown are not referred to as crown attorneys (Senior General Counsel, general counsel), or simply crown counsel although both criminal and civil attorneys generally report to the provincial Attorney-General's office. Lawyers who work for the Federal Ministry of Justice are often referred to as Crowns even if acting in civil matters. Moreover, lawyers, students-at-law and other persons who only represent the Crown on provincial offences matters (such as municipal by-law enforcement and traffic offences) are referred to as "provincial prosecutors" or "provincial offences attorneys" (POAs) rather than crown attorneys. Regardless of whether the prosecuted matter is a criminal offence or a provincial offence, crown Attorneys represent and argue on behalf of the Crown. In the province of Ontario, there is only one crown attorney appointed by the Attorney General per judicial district. The crown attorney is charged with supervising the office at the local level, and has a level of autonomy from the Attorney General's office. A crown attorney will then, in consultation with the Attorney General's office, hire assistant crown attorneys to further staff the office and prosecute offences. In this respect, Ontario functions similar to the US system of district attorneys and assistant district attorneys, although within the aspects of the Canadian legal system.

As crown attorneys are not elected, the Canadian prosecutorial system is often seen as less politically motivated than other systems.

See also

 Crown Attorney's Office of Ontario
 Crown prosecutor
 Crown counsel
 Public Prosecution Service of Canada

References

Sources
Crown attorney on the Canadian Encyclopedia

Law of Canada
Legal professions
Prosecution

es:Fiscalía General